Television networks in the United States are in four lists:
 List of United States over-the-air television networks
 List of United States cable and satellite television networks
 List of defunct television networks in the United States